Eduardo Terrazas (born 6 March 1962) is a Bolivian footballer. He played in eight matches for the Bolivia national football team in 1983. He was also part of Bolivia's squad for the 1983 Copa América tournament.

References

External links
 

1962 births
Living people
Association football goalkeepers
Bolivian footballers
Bolivia international footballers
People from Sara Province